AfroBasket 2015 Qualification occurred on various dates between 21 September 2014 and 8 March 2015. It was used to determine which African national basketball teams would qualify for the 2015 FIBA Africa Championship. Teams competed with other teams in their respective "zones" for a spot in the Championship tournament.

Qualified Teams
Four teams qualified for the tournament before the qualification round took place. Twelve more teams claimed spots in the tournament through Zonal Qualifying.

Qualified as the host nation:

From qualification:

Selected as wild cards:

Zones

Zone 1
Zone 1 was played from January 6 to February 15 2015 in Algiers, Algeria and Salé, Morocco.

|}

Zone 2
Zone 2 was played from February 12 to February 25 2015 in Bamako, Mali and Dakar, Senegal from 1 group and Praia, Cape Verde from group 2.

Group B

|}

Group C

|}

Zone 3
Zone 3 was played from February 7 to February 8 2015 in Cotonou, Benin.

Group D

|}

Group E

|}

Zone 4

Group F

|}

Group G

|}

Zone 5
Zone 5 was played from September 21 to September 28 2014 in Kampala, Uganda.

|}

Zone 6

Group I

|}

Group J

|}

Wild cards
Seven countries applied for three wild card berths. After its meeting in March, the FIBA Africa Central Board announced that the announcement of the wild cards was postponed up to the end of April.

Note

References 

AfroBasket qualification
2015 in African basketball
2014 in African basketball
qualification